Türkmenbaşı Nature Park is a nature park located in Sarıyer district of Istanbul Province, Turkey.

It was established in 1998 as a place, to dignify the cultural values shared by Turkey and Turkmenistan. It was named "Turkmenbashi" (literally: Head of Turkmens), in honor of Saparmurat Niyazov (1940–2006), the leader of Turkmenistan.

The nature park offers outdoor recreation activities such as hiking and picnicing for visitors on daily basis. There is a playground for children.

Ecosystem
Flora
Common plant of the nature park is pine. Other notable trees are oak (Quercus petraea), hornbeam (Carpinus betulus), oriental plane (Platanus orientalis), Norway spruce (Picea abies), Mediterranean cypress (Cupressus sempervirens), honeyberry, (Celtis australis), medlar (Mespilus germanica),
shinglewood (Thuja plicata) and the shrubs lavender (Lavandula spica), barberry (Berberis vulgaris), glossy abelia (Abelia × grandiflora), pittosporum (Pittosporum tobira), cherry laurel (Laurocerasus officinalis), Chinese photinia (Photinia serratifolia), strawberry tree (Arbutus unedo),
Japanese aucuba (Aucuba japonica), fountainplant (Ophiopogon japonicus).

Fauna
The main fauna of the nature park consists of bird species. Observed bird species are finch, magpie, sparrow, Western jackdaw, woodpecker. Other species are lizard and chipmunk.

References

Nature parks in Turkey
Protected areas established in 1998
1998 establishments in Turkey
Parks in Istanbul
Sarıyer
Turkey–Turkmenistan relations